Housing indicators are policy indicators designed to measure progress toward achieving housing policy goals. A housing indicator is a single, usually dimensionless number that points the way to improving housing outcomes. Because housing policy is heavily intertwined with other sectors such as social, economic, demographic and labour policy, and with the construction and finance industries, it requires a fairly comprehensive system of indicators to cover most of the key policies and issues. Housing indicator sets may contain political bias supporting the agendas or interests of those drawing up the system..

The most sustained effort in housing indicators has been the The World Bank/UN-Habitat Housing Indicators Programme, which was operational from 1992 to 2001. A set of 35 housing indicators was subject to a pilot test in 52 countries in 1992-3. A reduced set of 10 indicators was collected in 254 cities as part of the Urban and Housing Indicators Programme in preparation for the Habitat II Conference in 1996, and again in 1999.

These housing indicators were intended to lift the profile of housing in national policy, and to act as a diagnostic system to detect poorly functioning housing markets and poorly directed housing policy. The most important indicator, the median house price-to-income ratio, is still frequently used as an affordability gauge.

A reconfigured indicators set was developed for Habitat for Humanity in 2008.

Background 
From the late 1970s there was a massive surge in urbanisation in the developing world, resulting in burgeoning slum or shanty populations surrounding most cities. Stephen Mayo (1939-1999), Principal Economist in the Word Bank, found that very similar countries had very different housing outcomes. Some had much tighter, more expensive and more crowded housing markets than others. He attributed this to restrictive land and building controls that made urban land scarce and expensive and encouraged invasion from squatter groups onto government and private land.

Following the International Year of Shelter for the Homeless, in 1988 the Global Shelter Strategy to the Year 2000 was adopted. This strategy was influenced by economic liberalism, and called for a fundamental shift in government policy away from the direct provision of housing towards an "enabling" legislative and regulatory environment that "facilitates, energises, and supports the activities of the private sector". The United Nations Centre for Human Settlements (now UN-Habitat) was requested to provide national monitoring of progress towards realising the goals of the Strategy.

The Housing Indicators Programme (HIP) was initiated jointly by the World Bank and UNCHS in October 1990, and was funded and supported by USAID. The methodology and the indicators were largely the brainchild of Mayo and Shlomo Angel, an Israeli expert on slums and urban development.

One of the main purposes of the housing indicators was to establish a system of diagnostics for a “well functioning housing market”. For example, various indicators might show a market in which land was being inadequately supplied, resulting in housing shortages and high prices. Deviations from standard benchmarks might show the presence of market distorting policies like rent control.

The indicators had a strong macroeconomic emphasis and some of the indicators were novel and original. The pilot program resulted in a detailed comparison of the housing sectors in major cities in 52 countries, through the collection of about 40 key indicators on a comparable basis. The final results of this pilot programme were not published until after the death of Mayo.

Subsequently, ten of these housing indicators were collected globally as part of a more comprehensive urban indicators system in the run up to the Habitat II Conference in Istanbul in 1996.

Separate housing indicators programmes were conducted in the early 1990s in a number of countries in the Caribbean, Anglophone Africa and Eastern Europe, generally funded by USAID, as part of an attempt to vitalize or revive the housing sectors of those countries.
The ten housing indicators that were collected for Habitat 2 in 1996 and Istanbul+5 in 2001, for approximately 235 cities around the world on each occasion, were:

 H1: House price to income ratio. Median house price/median household income. A primary indicator of the health of housing markets.
 H2: House rent to income ratio. Median rent/median income of renters. Less than 20% usually means that rent control is in place.
 H3: Floor area per person. Consumption indicator, highly correlated with city product
 H4: Permanent structures. Per cent structures of permanent materials. Residual is the very poorest communities.
 H5: Unauthorised housing. Per cent stock not in compliance with current regulations. Establishes the size of the informal sector.
 H6: Land development multiplier. Ratio of median land price of a developed plot at the urban fringe and the median price of raw, undeveloped land. Shows markup due to development approval.
 H7: Infrastructure expenditure. Total annual expenditures on infrastructure services per person. 
 H8: Mortgage to credit ratio. Ratio of mortgage loans to all loans. Over 25% in developed countries, almost negligible elsewhere.
 H9: Housing production. Net number of housing units produced per 1000 population. A major measure of boom/bust or vigour of the sector. Usually unknown when informal sector is large.
 H10: Housing investment. Investment in housing /gross city product. Measures importance of housing in the local economy.

Mean value of the ten key housing indicators, by development quintile, Habitat II collection 1996. 

Source Flood (1997), tables 12 and 13 The development level of cities was defined using the City Development Index.

The table shows the 1996 averages for these indicators over cities of different levels of development. Indicators H3, H4, H5, H7 and H8 increased with the level of development, as they represent increased consumption, improved dwelling quality, and more developed mortgage systems. House prices were highest with respect to income at middle levels of development - probably because formal sector construction standards are enforced before incomes have risen sufficiently to justify them. Rents H2 fell with development until the final quintile. The construction indicators H9 and H10 were correlated with rates of urban household formation.

An extended housing indicator system was provided with the main survey. Some of those indicators have been widely used in OECD countries:

 HA1. Mortgage affordability. Proportion of households who are eligible for and can afford the maximum loan on a median priced formal sector house 
 HA2. Excessive housing expenditure. Proportion of households in the bottom 40% of incomes who are spending more than 30% of their incomes on housing. Known as “core housing need” in Canada and “housing stress” in Australia
 HA6. Overcrowding. Households with too few bedrooms 
 HA8. Inadequate housing. Requiring substantial repairs to bring them to accepted standards
 HA11. Homelessness. Number of people per thousand who sleep outside dwelling units or in temporary shelter

Aftermath 
The housing indicators movement and its associated enabling strategy had a lasting impact on thinking about housing policy in the developing world, although its “soft” market-oriented philosophy was unevenly adopted.

The main criticism of the housing indicators were in keeping with the origins of the system - that they referred largely to the economic part of the economic-social-environmental nexus, and had little distributional or environmental content. Ultimately the “enabling approach” appealed neither to the growing sustainability movement nor to economic fundamentalists. Specialist departments of housing mostly disappeared, and much of the effort in collecting and maintaining housing market indicators devolved to the private sector.

Within UN-Habitat, the indicators were discontinued after 2003 when effort was redirected towards the Millennium Indicators. These were all to be collected at the individual household level, with no market or economy-wide indicators.

In 2008, Shlomo Angel redefined the housing indicators on behalf of Habitat for Humanity. The new collection had little overlap with the original, although some themes were the same. It was intended that this collection should continue after a 15-country pilot, but again this did not eventuate.

Other housing indicators 
Countries have frequently assembled housing-related statistics, but they have not been part of a policy system.

In Britain, the Netherlands, Scandinavia and other parts of Europe, the move away from public and council housing towards housing associations has strongly encouraged the development of performance indicators. There is a very substantial literature in the area.

Countries have continued to investigate the relationship between tight land controls and high house prices, or have produced housing data dashboards. The OECD monitors housing affordability in its member countries.

References 

Affordable housing
Aid
Economic indicators
United Nations Development Group